Zorya Yakovlevna Shapiro (7 December 1914 – 4 July 2013) was a Soviet mathematician, educator and translator. She is known for her contributions to representation theory and functional analysis in her collaboration with Israel Gelfand, and the Shapiro-Lobatinski condition in elliptical boundary value problems.

Life
Zorya Shapiro attended the Moscow State University Faculty of Mechanics and Mathematics from where she received her undergraduate and doctoral degrees by 1938. She was active in the military department of the university, especially in aviation, learning to fly and land aeroplanes.

She started her teaching career at the Faculty, shortly after Zoya Kishkina (1917–1989) and Natalya Eisenstadt (1912–1985), and very quickly became recognized for her courses in analysis.

Shapiro married Israel Gelfand in 1942. They had 3 sons, one of whom died in childhood. Shapiro and Gelfand later divorced.

In the 1980s, Shapiro lived in the same house as Akiva Yaglom. In 1991 Shapiro moved to River Forest, Illinois to live with her younger son. She died there on 4 July 2013.

Career
Shapiro published several works on representation theory. A contribution (with Gelfand) in integral geometry was to find inversion formulae for the reconstruction of the value of a function on a manifold in terms of integrals over a family of submanifolds, a result with applicability in non-linear differential equations, tomography, multi-dimensional complex analysis and other domains. Another work was on the representations of rotation groups of 3-dimensional spaces.

Shapiro is best known for her elucidation of the conditions for well-defined solutions to the elliptical boundary value problem on Sobolev spaces.

Selected publications

Articles
 
 
 
  (with I.M. Gelfand)
 
  (with I.M. Gelfand)
 
  (with I.M. Gelfand, M.I. Graev)
  (with I.M. Gelfand, M.I. Graev)
  (with I.M. Gelfand, M.I. Graev)
  (with I.M. Gelfand, M.I. Graev)
  (with I.M. Gelfand, S.G. Gindikin)

Books
  (with I.M. Gelfand, R.A. Minlos)

Translations

From French

From English

References 

1914 births
2013 deaths
Soviet women mathematicians
Soviet mathematicians
Moscow State University alumni
Academic staff of Moscow State University
Soviet emigrants to the United States